"Unbreakable Heart" is a song written by Benmont Tench and first recorded by American country music artist Carlene Carter.  It was released in October 1993 as the second single from her album Little Love Letters, produced by Howie Epstein, Tench's bandmate in Tom Petty and the Heartbreakers. The song reached #51 on the Billboard Hot Country Singles & Tracks chart. In 2000, it was a single for Jessica Andrews.

Chart performance

Jessica Andrews version
The song was covered by American country music artist Jessica Andrews.  It was released in March 2000 as the third single from the album Heart Shaped World.  The song reached #24 on the Billboard Hot Country Singles & Tracks chart.

Chart performance

References

1993 songs
1993 singles
2000 singles
Carlene Carter songs
Jessica Andrews songs
Songs written by Benmont Tench
Song recordings produced by Howie Epstein
Song recordings produced by Byron Gallimore
Giant Records (Warner) singles
DreamWorks Records singles